The Drummond Tobacco Company was an American tobacco company in St. Louis, Missouri.

History
The company was founded in 1873, when it started making Chesterfield cigarettes. Its headquarters in St. Louis was designed by architect Isaac S. Taylor in 1885. The company later also produced Horseshoe brand chewing tobacco. It was acquired by the American Tobacco Company in 1898.

References

Tobacco companies of the United States
Companies based in St. Louis
American companies established in 1873
American companies disestablished in 1898
Defunct companies based in Missouri
1898 disestablishments in Missouri
1873 establishments in Missouri